Empire Subang is a mixed-commercial development located in Subang Jaya, Selangor, Malaysia which comprises soho office towers, an upscale shopping mall and a 4-star hotel. It is located in the downtown area of Subang Jaya, near Subang Parade, Wisma Consplant (formerly the HQ for oil palm giant Sime Darby Plantation) and the Subang Jaya railway station. The building is categorized into four sections, notably Empire Soho, Empire Tower, Empire Hotel and Empire Shopping Gallery. Empire Shopping Gallery and Empire Hotel were opened in 2010.

Empire Shopping Gallery

Empire Shopping Gallery is an upscale shopping centre. The mall is five storeys high and comprises 180 stores. There is also a slide called Lex Slide which was imported from Germany and stood 50 meters tall and ran through 5 floors. The slide was removed in January 2013 due to the end of a contract between the mall and the company which produced the slide. Tangs (now Galeries Voir), Jaya Grocer, ESH, Toys "R" Us, Popular Bookstore, and Fitness First serve as the junior anchor tenants in the mall. There is a wide variety of dining restaurants such as Din Tai Fung, Chili's,  La Bodega, Italiannies, The Social, Marutama Ramen, Pasta Zanmai, Rakuzen and Serai among others.

Empire Hotel Subang
Empire Hotel Subang is a 4-star business hotel with 198 rooms. It is 13-storeys high and consists of a multi-purpose convention hall, a few restaurants and a cafe.

2011 explosion
On 28 September 2011, an explosion occurred at the mall at 3:45am. The fire department believed that the explosion was caused by a gas leak. The mall reopened on 15 November 2011 after almost two months of repairs and further safety measures were taken. Four people were injured in the incident and many luxury cars were damaged. Some damage was also seen at Wisma Consplant located opposite the mall.

References

2010 establishments in Malaysia
Hotels established in 2010
Shopping malls in Selangor
Shopping malls established in 2010
Subang Jaya